Richard S. Fowler (April 12, 1932 – July 8, 2012) was a member of the Legislative Assembly of Alberta, Minister of the Crown in the Government of Alberta, mayor of St. Albert, Alberta, and Judge of the Provincial Court of Alberta.

Fowler was first elected mayor of St. Albert in 1965, and served a single term.  He did not seek re-election in 1968.  He returned to office in 1980 by acclamation to replace the retiring Ronald Harvey.  He was acclaimed again in 1983 and re-elected in 1986 with nearly seventy percent of the vote.  He resigned in 1989, months before the end of his third term, to run as the Progressive Conservative candidate in the 1989 provincial election in St. Albert.

Incumbent New Democrat Bryan Strong was not seeking re-election, and Fowler defeated his closest challenger, Liberal Len Bracko, by more than two thousand votes.  He was appointed Solicitor General by Premier Don Getty and served as such until February 1992, when Getty appointed him to the portfolios of Municipal Affairs and Native Affairs.  When Ralph Klein became Premier in December 1992, Fowler was named Minister of Justice and Attorney General.  He was defeated by Bracko in the 1993 election.

Fowler also served as justice of the Provincial Court of Alberta.

Richard S. Fowler Junior High School in St. Albert is named in his honour. Fowler died in 2012 after many years of ill health.

References

External links
Legislative Assembly of Alberta Members Listing

1932 births
2012 deaths
Judges in Alberta
Lawyers in Alberta
Mayors of St. Albert, Alberta
People from Edson, Alberta
Progressive Conservative Association of Alberta MLAs
Members of the Executive Council of Alberta
20th-century Canadian politicians